Roberto Rosato (18 August 1943 – 20 June 2010) was an Italian footballer, who played as a defender.

A strong, hard-tackling, and reliable centre-back, he is regarded as one of Italy's greatest defenders.

Rosato played for four different Italian clubs throughout his career, but is mainly remembered for his successful stint with A.C. Milan, where he won several domestic and international titles. At international level, he represented Italy in two FIFA World Cups, reaching the final in 1970, and won UEFA Euro 1968.

Club career
Rosato played for 15 seasons (351 games, 10 goals) in the Serie A for A.C. Torino (1960–66), A.C. Milan (1966–1973) and Genoa C.F.C. (1973–1977), before moving to Aosta (1977–79), playing in Serie D for two seasons before officially retiring in 1979. He made his Serie A debut with Torino, in a 1–1 away draw against Fiorentina on 2 April 1961. Rosato is mostly remembered for his highly successful period with Milan, where he won several domestic and international trophies (1 Serie A A title, 3 Coppa Italia titles, 1 European Cup, 2 UEFA Cup Winners' Cups, and 1 Intercontinental Cup), forming a formidable back-line alongside Cudicini, Schnellinger, Anquilletti, and Trapattoni. He made his Milan debut on 4 September 1966, in a 3–0 away Serie A win over Pisa; in total he made 269 appearances with the club, scoring 8 goals, 5 of which came in Serie A in 187 appearances.

International career
Rosato also played 37 matches for the Italy national football team from 1965 to 1973. An important member of the Italian national side, he gave one of his best performances during his debut under manager Edmondo Fabbri in 1966, in a 1–1 away draw against West Germany; after the match, he was dubbed the “Hammer of Hamburg” (Il Martello d'Amburgo) by the media, due to his tenacity and determination throughout the match. He participated in two World Cups (1966 and 1970), where is widely remembered for an important goal-line clearance on Gerd Müller in Italy's 4–3 semi-final win over West Germany, which is known as "the Match of the Century". Rosato was also a member of the team that lost 4–1 to Brazil in the 1970 FIFA World Cup Final; after the tournament he was elected the best central defender of the tournament. At the end of the game he swapped shirts with Pelé. He sold the shirt for a record £157,750 at auction in 2002. was also part of the Italian team that won the 1968 UEFA European Football Championship and the Gold Medal at the 1963 Mediterranean Games.

Style of play
A powerful, consistent, hard-tackling, and tenacious man-marking centre-back, Rosato is regarded as one of the greatest and most complete Italian defenders of all time, due to his strong performances throughout his career. In addition to his tough, determined, physical, and aggressive style of play, he was also extremely composed and elegant on the ball, due to his notable technical ability and balance; he was also known for his commanding influence on the pitch.

Personal life
Rosato was frequently known by his team-mates and the media as "Angel Face" (Faccia d'Angelo) under manager Nereo Rocco, due to his delicate, handsome physical features, which were thought to contrast with his determination and ruggedness on the pitch. Rosato is born on the same day as his Milan team-mate and "twin", as he was known, Gianni Rivera.

Rosato died on 20 June 2010, at the age of 66, after struggling with a lengthy illness; after news of his death was aired, the Italian team wore black armbands in memory of Rosato in their 2010 FIFA World Cup game against New Zealand later that day.

Honours

Club
Milan
 Serie A: 1967–68
 Coppa Italia: 1966–67, 1971–72, 1972–73
 European Cup: 1968–69
 UEFA Cup Winners' Cup: 1967–68, 1972–73
 Intercontinental Cup: 1969

International
Italy
 UEFA European Football Championship: 1968
 Mediterranean Games: 1963

Individual
 A.C. Milan Hall of Fame
 Medaglia d'oro al valore atletico

References

External links
 

1943 births
2010 deaths
Italian footballers
Italy international footballers
Serie A players
Serie B players
Torino F.C. players
A.C. Milan players
Genoa C.F.C. players
1966 FIFA World Cup players
1970 FIFA World Cup players
UEFA Euro 1968 players
UEFA European Championship-winning players
Association football defenders
Mediterranean Games gold medalists for Italy
Mediterranean Games medalists in football
Competitors at the 1963 Mediterranean Games
People from Chieri
Footballers from Piedmont
Sportspeople from the Metropolitan City of Turin